was the twenty-second of twenty-four s, or the second of the  (if that sub-class is regarded independently), built for the Imperial Japanese Navy in the inter-war period. When introduced into service, these ships were the most powerful destroyers in the world. They remained formidable ships well into the Pacific War. Hibiki was among the few destroyers to survive the war (since she was not actively participating in the war). In 1947; two years after she was struck from the Japanese navy list, Hibiki was transferred to the Soviet Navy as a war reparation, and was later sunk as a target practice somewhere in the 1970's.

History
Construction of the advanced Fubuki-class destroyers was authorized as part of the Imperial Japanese Navy's expansion program from fiscal 1923, intended to give Japan a qualitative edge with the world's most modern ships. The Fubuki class had performance that was a quantum leap over previous destroyer designs, so much so that they were designated . The large size, powerful engines, high speed, large radius of action and unprecedented armament gave these destroyers the firepower similar to many light cruisers in other navies. The Akatsuki sub-class was an improved version of the Fubuki, externally almost identical, but incorporating changes to her propulsion system.

Hibiki, built at the Maizuru Naval Arsenal in Osaka was the third in the “Type III” improved series of Fubuki destroyers, incorporating a modified gun turret which could elevate her main battery of 12.7 cm/50 Type 3 naval guns to 75° as opposed to the original 40°, thus giving the gun a nominal ability as an anti-aircraft weapon. Hibiki was laid down on 21 February 1930, launched on 16 June 1932 and commissioned on 31 March 1933.

Operational history

World War II
At the time of the attack on Pearl Harbor, Hibiki was assigned to Destroyer Division 6 of Desron 1 of the IJN 1st Fleet, and had deployed from Mako Guard District to provide cover for Admiral Nobutake Kondō’s Southern Force, escorting Japanese troopships for landing operations in the Malaya and the invasion of the Philippines, and continued to support operations throughout the Philippines to the end of March 1942.

After repairs at Yokosuka Naval Arsenal in April, Hibiki deployed from Ōminato Guard District in support of the invasion of Kiska in the Aleutians campaign of May–June 1942. On 12 June, she was damaged at Kiska in an attack by United States Navy PBY Catalina flying boats, and was forced to return to Ōminato at the end of the month. Repairs at Yokosuka lasted until October.

From May 1943, Hibiki returned to northern waters, and was assigned to patrols off the coast of Hokkaidō and the Chishima islands. Hibiki subsequently assisted in the evacuation of surviving Japanese forces from the Aleutians through August.

After maintenance at Yokosuka in September, Hibiki was sent to Shanghai, from which she escorted a troop convoy to Truk and Rabaul. Through the end of November, she was assigned to escort of tanker convoys between Balikpapan, Singapore and Truk and as a high speed transport between Truk, Ponape and various islands in the Carolines. She rescued the survivors from the torpedoed tanker Terukawa Maru on 21 December. She returned to Kure Naval Arsenal, for maintenance in April, during which additional anti-aircraft guns were fitted at the expense of one of her main gun turrets.

During May and June 1944, Hibiki was assigned to escort of tanker convoys. On 14 May, she rescued the 125 survivors of her torpedoed sister ship .

During the Battle of the Philippine Sea, Hibiki was assigned to the First Supply Force, and suffered minor damage and two crewmen killed in strafing attacks by Allied aircraft.

In August, Hibiki escorted two convoys from Moji to Takao and Okinawa. In September, after departing from Takao with a convoy bound for Manila, Hibiki was torpedoed by the submarine ; the explosion almost severed her bow. She was withdrawn back to Yokosuka for extensive repairs.

On 25 January 1945, Hibiki was reassigned to Destroyer Division 7 of the IJN 2nd Fleet, but was retained in Japanese home waters. She was then reassigned to the First Escort Fleet in May, and transferred to Kure Naval District, where she remained as a guard ship to the surrender of Japan. After the end of the war, she was demilitarized and used as a repatriation vessel, and was struck from the navy list on 5 October 1945.

In Soviet service
On 5 April 1947, Hibiki was turned over to the Soviet Union at Nakhodka as a prize of war, and placed in service with the Soviet Navy under the name Verniy ( "Faithful" ), after being rearmed with Soviet-made weapons (six 130 mm guns, seven 25 mm guns, four to six 12.7 mm machine guns, and six 533 mm torpedo tubes). She was placed in service with the Soviet Pacific Fleet based at Vladivostok on 7 July 1947. She was renamed again on 5 July 1948 as Dekabrist ( "Decembrist").  She stood at the piers almost a year, waiting for rearming, before being retired from active service and used as a floating barracks ship, until retirement from service on 20 February 1953 and transferred to the OMS resourcing fund. Eventually, she was used as target-practice somewhere in the 1970s, where she was finally sunk.

The wreck of Hibiki lies close to Karamzina Island near Vladivostok, 27 meters deep, and can be explored with diving gear. Local diving tours in Russia for exploring the wreckage can be arranged as well.

Notes

References

External links

Akatsuki-class destroyers (1931)
Destroyers of the Soviet Navy
Ships built by Maizuru Naval Arsenal
1932 ships
World War II destroyers of Japan
Ships of the Aleutian Islands campaign
Japan–Soviet Union relations
Ships sunk as targets